The 1967–68 Chicago Bulls season was the second season of the franchise in the National Basketball Association (NBA).

Draft picks

Note: This is not an extensive list; it only covers the first and second rounds, and any other players drafted by the franchise that played at least one NBA game.

Roster

Regular season
After that promising beginning the Bulls fell apart. During the 1967-68 NBA season the club traded Guy Rodgers, the steadiest player on the squad, to the Cincinnati Royals for Flynn Robinson and two future draft choices. Chicago lost its first nine games, slumping to 1–15 before climbing back to respectability. The Bulls went 28–38 the rest of the way but still finished 29–53.

Even that record was better than those of the new expansion teams in Seattle and San Diego, so the Bulls still snuck into the playoffs, where they were drubbed by the Lakers in the division semifinals. Bob Boozer, a 6–8 forward who had the most productive seasons of his 11-year career while playing for Chicago, led the team in scoring with 21.5 points per game, and Jim Washington topped the club in rebounding with 10.1 boards per contest.

When Jerry Colangelo left the Bulls' front office to run the Phoenix Suns expansion franchise, he took Kerr along as coach. Kerr's replacement for the 1968–69 season was Dick Motta, who had won three Big Sky Conference championships at Weber State. Motta was an unlikely choice, but he proved to be a fortuitous one. In the early 1970s he molded Chicago into a tough, defensive-minded squad that was always ready to challenge the opposition, even if it couldn't match up in talent.

Chicago owned the fourth overall pick in the 1968 NBA Draft and selected 7-foot, 265-pound center Tom Boerwinkle of Tennessee. Boerwinkle would spend his entire 10-year career with Chicago and wind up as the Bulls' all-time leading rebounder with 5,745 career boards.

Season standings

Record vs. opponents

Game log

Playoffs

|- align="center" bgcolor="#ffcccc"
| 1
| March 24
| @ Los Angeles
| L 101–109
| Bob Boozer (27)
| Jim Washington (11)
| Keith Erickson (5)
| The Forum7,352
| 0–1
|- align="center" bgcolor="#ffcccc"
| 2
| March 25
| @ Los Angeles
| L 106–111
| Flynn Robinson (32)
| Jim Washington (13)
| Bob Boozer (4)
| The Forum8,158
| 0–2
|- align="center" bgcolor="#ccffcc"
| 3
| March 27
| Los Angeles
| W 104–98
| Flynn Robinson (41)
| Jim Washington (17)
| Flynn Robinson (4)
| Chicago Stadium3,456
| 1–2
|- align="center" bgcolor="#ffcccc"
| 4
| March 29
| Los Angeles
| L 87–93
| Keith Erickson (20)
| Jim Washington (19)
| Erickson, Sloan (2)
| Chicago Stadium5,678
| 1–3
|- align="center" bgcolor="#ffcccc"
| 5
| March 31
| @ Los Angeles
| L 99–122
| Jim Washington (24)
| Jim Washington (15)
| three players tied (4)
| The Forum12,108
| 1–4
|-

Awards and records
Bob Boozer, NBA All-Star Game

References

Chicago Bulls seasons
Chicago
Chicago Bulls
Chicago Bulls